The Lakhta Center is an 87-story skyscraper built in the northwestern neighbourhood of Lakhta in Saint Petersburg, Russia. It is also the second-tallest structure in Russia and Europe, behind the Ostankino Tower in Moscow, in addition to being the second-tallest twisted building and the northernmost skyscraper in the world. 

Construction of Lakhta Center started on 30 October 2012, with the building topping out on 29 January 2018. It surpassed the Vostok Tower of the Federation Towers in Moscow as the tallest building in Russia and Europe on 5 October 2017. The centre is designed for large-scale mixed-use development, consisting of public facilities and offices. First designed by British architectural firm RMJM, the project was then continued by Gorproject (2011–2017) under the main contractor, Turkish company Rönesans Holding.

On 24 December 2018, Lakhta Center was certified according to the criteria of ecological efficiency at LEED Platinum. In August 2021, Gazprom, formerly headquartered in Moscow, completed its re-registration process in Saint Petersburg. The new address of the company is at the Lakhta Center Multifunctional Complex.

History

Planning

The predecessor of the tower, the Okhta Center, was originally planned to be more centrally located in the city center of St. Petersburg. As the historical center has been a World Heritage Site since 1990, the World Heritage Committee opposed the construction of the 400-metre tower as it would affect the cityscape of historic Saint Petersburg. In December 2006 UNESCO World Heritage Centre Director Francesco Bandarin reminded Russia about its obligations to preserve it and expressed concern over the project. In 2007, the World Monuments Fund placed the historic skyline of St. Petersburg on its 2008 Watch List of 100 Most Endangered Sites due to the potential construction of the building. Due to this sizeable backlash on the original proposition, the Okhta Center, which had been planned by Gazprom to be in front of Smolny Cathedral, was moved to Lakhta. Plans for a new metro station in the area were announced in March 2012. The station was originally included in the 1980 city development plan of Leningrad  but had not been built before.

The permit for construction of the first stage of Lakhta Center, which included the skyscraper and stylobate, was obtained on 17 August 2012.

Construction 
Project management is being done by AECOM. German company Josef Gartner was in charge of the glazing of the skyscraper.

Zero cycle works started on 30 October 2012. The main contractor for the construction of Lakhta Center, Rönesans Holding, was selected on 22 April 2014.

Construction schedule 

 March 2013 – zero cycle works are in progress. Piles are being installed. According to the schedule of construction a diaphragm wall is to be completed by the end of April while piling works will continue until 15 August 2013.
 April 2014 – construction of the skyscraper's foundation pit is complete.
 June 2014 – piling is completed. 264 piles were mounted for the tower of Lakhta Center, 848 piles were mounted for the mixed-use building and entrance arch and 968 piles were mounted for the stylobate (underground parking). All in all 2080 piles were dug in.
 February and March 2015 – the pouring of the bottom slab of the skyscraper's box shaped foundation is over. 19,624 cubic meters of concrete were cast in the foundation.
 September 2015 - all works below zero elevation are finished. The construction of the first floors of the tower core is underway.
 April 2017 -  height exceeds 300 meters, making Lakhta Center a supertall building (international classification).
 May 2017 - the skyscraper reached a height of 327 meters, making it the tallest structure in St. Petersburg.
 5 October 2017 - Lakhta center became the tallest building in Europe as it reached a height of 374 meters.
 29 January 2018 - the height of the tower is 462 meters and the assembly of the spire structure is complete.

Other buildings 
In addition to the tower, the complex contains multiple other buildings. The multi-functional building (MFZ) consists of two buildings, North and South, which are united by a common foundation, stylobate and roof. The building resembles a boomerang. It has a variable number of storeys with a height difference from 7 to 17 floors, with the peak height being a little more than 80 meters. The structure is approximately 300 meters long. The complex also has a third building, which consists of two separate wings connected by a courtyard. The MFZ contains a planetarium, which has a holding capacity of 140 people.

Design

Facilities 
The Lakhta Center contains offices, a co-working center, a sports center, a children's science center, and a conference center. The project includes 1,500 square meters of indoor exhibition space. Part of the open area will be used to demonstrate art, installations and sculptures.
There is a free public observation deck at the top of the skyscraper at a height of 357 meters.

Environmental technologies 
The design of the tower contains several green and energy-saving technologies, which earned it a LEED Platinum certificate. Excess heat generated by technical equipment is used to heat the premises. The skyscraper also uses equipment with reduced noise levels along with noise suppressors, sound-proof curtain walls and floating floors.

Due to the peculiarities of the highly humid and windy climate in the North Western region of Russia, the possibility of icing up of buildings is relatively high. In order to prevent complete icing up of the tower's spire, engineers changed glassing to metal gauze. Glass at high floors will be heated to prevent ice accumulation, ensuring good visibility.

In order to provide Lakhta Center and adjoining areas with electricity without imposing any extra burden on existing infrastructure, a new standalone power substation will be constructed.

Transportation development
Two traffic circles are to be built near Lakhta Center, which will become part of the М32А highway in the future.
A light rail service from Finland Railway Station and a new tram line from Primorskaya underground station will be built to serve Lakhta Center. Plans are ongoing to build a new underground station with the working title of "Lakhta". Bicycle lanes near Lakhta Center with 90 parking places for bicycles are also planned.

Reception
Lakhta Center received the Emporis Skyscraper Awards' "Skyscraper of the Year"-award in 2020. On 20 May 2021, the skyscraper won the facade engineering category award at the CTBUH Awards. The building also received 2 other Awards of Excellence that year: the structural engineering and geotechnical engineering awards. In October 2021, IFC Lakhta Center won the Grand Prix of Russia's largest engineering and architectural award 100 + Awards

See also
List of tallest buildings in Russia
List of tallest buildings in Europe
 List of twisted buildings

References

External links
 Official site of Lakhta Center

Culture in Saint Petersburg
Buildings and structures in Saint Petersburg
Architecture in Russia
Gazprom
Skyscrapers in Russia
Twisted buildings and structures
2019 establishments in Russia